Seher Çakır (born in 1971, Istanbul, Turkey) is a Turkish-Austrian poet and the founding member and author of the German-Turkish newspaper Öneri. Since 1983 she has been living in Vienna.

Works 
Çakır, living in Wien since 1983, released her first lyrics in the bilingual (German/Turkish) journal  Öneri. Short stories have additionally been published in the anthologies Die Fremde in mir (the foreign within me) (1999) and Eure Sprache ist nicht meine Sprache (your language is not my language) (2002). 

The National Library of German Lyrics (Nationalbibliothek des deutschsprachigen Gedichtes in München) tabulates Çakır in its 2003 list of collected works (Ausgewählte Werke VI) (2003).

In 2005 Çakır was awarded at the literature competitions "Schreiben zwischen den Kulturen" (writing between cultures).

References

External links
Oneri Official Website
 

1971 births
Living people
Austrian people of Turkish descent
Austrian women poets
Austrian women writers
Turkish women poets
Turkish emigrants to Austria